Vermont
The following outline is provided as an overview of and topical guide to the U.S. state of Vermont:

Vermont –  state in the New England region of the northeastern United States. Vermont is the leading producer of maple syrup in the United States. The state capital is Montpelier with a population of 7,855, making it the least populous state capital in the country.

General reference 

 Names
 Common name: Vermont
 Pronunciation: 
 Official name: State of Vermont
 Abbreviations and name codes
 Postal symbol:  VT
 ISO 3166-2 code:  US-VT
 Internet second-level domain:  .vt.us
 Nicknames
Green Mountain State (currently used on license plates)
 Adjectival: Vermont
 Demonym: Vermonter

Geography of Vermont 

Geography of Vermont
 Vermont is: a U.S. state, a federal state of the United States of America
 Location
 Northern hemisphere
 Western hemisphere
 Americas
 North America
 Anglo America
 Northern America
 United States of America
 Contiguous United States
 Canada–US border
 Eastern United States
 East Coast of the United States – though Vermont does not include any actual coastline, it is generally considered to be part of the Eastern Seaboard region.
 Northeastern United States
 New England
 Population of Vermont: 625,741  (2010 U.S. Census)
 Area of Vermont:
 Atlas of Vermont

Places in Vermont 

 Historic places in Vermont
 National Historic Landmarks in Vermont
 National Register of Historic Places listings in Vermont
 Bridges on the National Register of Historic Places in Vermont
 National Natural Landmarks in Vermont
 Marsh-Billings-Rockefeller National Historical Park
 State parks in Vermont
 List of tallest buildings in Vermont

Environment of Vermont 

 Climate of Vermont
 Climate change in Vermont
 Protected areas in Vermont
 State forests of Vermont
 Superfund sites in Vermont
 Wildlife of Vermont
 Fauna of Vermont
 Birds of Vermont
 Earth Peoples Park

Natural geographic features of Vermont 

 Lakes of Vermont
 Mountains of Vermont
 Rivers of Vermont

Regions of Vermont 

 Central Vermont
 Northeast Kingdom

Administrative divisions of Vermont 

 The 14 counties of the state of Vermont
 Municipalities in Vermont
 Cities in Vermont
 State capital of Vermont:
 City nicknames in Vermont
 Towns in Vermont
 Village (Vermont)
 Gore (surveying)

Demography of Vermont 

Demographics of Vermont

Government and politics of Vermont 

Politics of Vermont
 Form of government: U.S. state government
 United States congressional delegations from Vermont
 Vermont State Capitol
 Elections in Vermont
 Electoral reform in Vermont
 Political party strength in Vermont

Branches of the government of Vermont 

Government of Vermont

Executive branch of the government of Vermont 
 Governor of Vermont
 Lieutenant Governor of Vermont
 Secretary of State of Vermont
 State departments
 Vermont Department of Transportation

Legislative branch of the government of Vermont 

 Vermont General Assembly (bicameral)
 Upper house: Vermont Senate
 Lower house: Vermont House of Representatives

Judicial branch of the government of Vermont 

Courts of Vermont
 Supreme Court of Vermont

Law and order in Vermont 

Law of Vermont
 Cannabis in Vermont
 Capital punishment in Vermont
 Constitution of Vermont
 Crime in Vermont
 Gun laws in Vermont
 Law enforcement in Vermont
 Law enforcement agencies in Vermont
 Vermont State Police
 Same-sex marriage in Vermont

Military in Vermont 

 Vermont Air National Guard
 Vermont Army National Guard

History of Vermont 

History of Vermont

History of Vermont, by period 
Prehistory of Vermont
French colony of Canada, 1534–(1609–1763)
King George's War, 1740–1748
Treaty of Aix-la-Chapelle of 1748
French and Indian War, 1754–1763
Treaty of Paris of 1763
Royal Proclamation of 1763
British Province of New-Hampshire, 1707–(1763–1776)
British Province of New-York, 1707–(1763–1776)
British Indian Reserve, 1763–1783
Republic of New Connecticut, 1777
Vermont Republic, 1777–1791
Slavery in Vermont
Vermont becomes the 14th state, admitted to the United States of America on March 4, 1791
American Civil War, April 12, 1861 – May 13, 1865
Vermont in the American Civil War
Chester A. Arthur becomes 21st President of the United States on September 19, 1881
Spanish–American War, April 25 – August 12, 1898
World War I, June 28, 1914 – November 11, 1918
United States enters Great War on April 6, 1917
Calvin Coolidge becomes 30th President of the United States on August 2, 1923

Culture of Vermont 

Culture of Vermont
 Cuisine of Vermont
 Museums in Vermont
 Religion in Vermont
 Episcopal Diocese of Vermont
 Scouting in Vermont
 Witch window
 State symbols of Vermont
 Flag of the State of Vermont 
 Great Seal of the State of Vermont

The arts in Vermont 
 Music of Vermont

Sports in Vermont 

Sports in Vermont

Economy and infrastructure of Vermont 

Economy of Vermont
 Communications in Vermont
 Newspapers in Vermont
 Radio stations in Vermont
 Television stations in Vermont
 Energy in Vermont
 Power stations in Vermont
 Solar power in Vermont
 Wind power in Vermont
 Health care in Vermont
 Hospitals in Vermont
 Transportation in Vermont
 Airports in Vermont
 Roads in Vermont
 State highways in Vermont

Education in Vermont 

Education in Vermont
 Schools in Vermont
 School districts in Vermont
 High schools in Vermont
 Colleges and universities in Vermont
 University of Vermont

See also

Topic overview:
Vermont

Index of Vermont-related articles

References

External links 

Vermont
Vermont
Vermont